The women's K-4 500 metres competition in canoeing at the 2008 Summer Olympics took place at the Shunyi Olympic Rowing-Canoeing Park in Beijing between August 18 and 22. The K-4 event is raced in four-person kayaks.

Competition consists of three rounds: the heats, the semifinals, and the final. All boats compete in the heats. The top three finishers in each of the two heats advance directly to the final, while the remaining four finishers from both heats move on to the semifinal. The top three finishers in the semifinal join the heats winners in the final.

Heats took place on August 18, semifinals on August 20, and the final on August 22.

Schedule
All times are China Standard Time (UTC+8)

Medalists

Results

Heats
Qualification Rules: 1..3->Final, 4..7->Semifinal + 8th best time, Rest Out

Heat 1

Heat 2

Semifinal
Qualification Rules: 1..3->Final, Rest Out

Final

For the fourth straight Summer Olympics, a Fischer won a gold medal in the K-4 500 m only this time it was not Birgit, but her niece Fanny. Wagner-Augustin won her third straight Olympic gold medal in the K-4 500 m event while Kovács of Hungary won her third straight Olympic silver medal in this event.

References

Sports-reference.com women's 2008 K-4 500 m results.
Yahoo! August 18, 2008 sprint heats results. – accessed August 19, 2008.
Yahoo! August 20, 2008 sprint semifinal results. – accessed August 20, 2008.
Yahoo! August 22, 2008 sprint final results. – accessed August 22, 2008.

Women's K-4 500
Olympic
Women's events at the 2008 Summer Olympics